The 1982 Toledo Rockets football team was an American football team that represented the University of Toledo in the Mid-American Conference (MAC) during the 1982 NCAA Division I-A football season. In their first season under head coach Dan Simrell, the Rockets compiled a 6–5 record (5–4 against MAC opponents), finished in a tie for fifth place in the MAC, and outscored all opponents by a combined total of 184 to 162.

The team's statistical leaders included Jim Kelso with 1,963 passing yards, Steve Morgan with 567 rushing yards, Capus Robinson with 709 receiving yards, and Tony Lee with 64 points scored.  Marlin Russell, Darryl Meadows, Steve Schafer, and Mike Russell were the team captains.

Schedule

References

Toledo
Toledo Rockets football seasons
Toledo Rockets football